Acanthogryllus is a genus of cricket in family Gryllidae.

Taxonomy
Genus contains the following species:
Acanthogryllus acus  Gorochov, 1988 
Acanthogryllus asiaticus  Gorochov, 1990 
Acanthogryllus brunneri  (Sélys-Longchamps, 1868)  
Acanthogryllus fortipes  (Walker, 1869)  
Acanthogryllus malgasus  Gorochov, 1988  
Acanthogryllus teretiusculus  Gorochov, 1988

References

Gryllinae
Orthoptera genera
Taxa named by Henri Louis Frédéric de Saussure